Richmond and Barnes was a parliamentary constituency in the London Borough of Richmond upon Thames, a south-western suburb of the capital. It returned one Member of Parliament (MP)  to the House of Commons of the Parliament of the United Kingdom.
The constituency was created in 1983 and abolished in 1997.

History
Richmond and Barnes was a Tory-Liberal marginal for its 14-year existence, and was represented for the whole of that time by Jeremy Hanley of the Conservative Party. Hanley's main opponent was Alan Watson of the SDP–Liberal Alliance, who narrowly failed to win the seat in the 1983 and 1987 elections.

Boundaries
The London Borough of Richmond upon Thames wards of Barnes, East Sheen, East Twickenham, Ham and Petersham, Kew, Mortlake, Palewell, Richmond Hill, and Richmond Town.

The constituency consisted of the northern part of the London Borough of Richmond upon Thames, being centred on the districts of Richmond and Barnes. It largely replaced the former Richmond (Surrey) constituency in 1983, and was largely replaced by the Richmond Park constituency in 1997.

Members of Parliament

Elections

Elections in the 1980s

Elections in the 1990s

See also
List of parliamentary constituencies in London

References

Sources

Parliamentary constituencies in London (historic)
Constituencies of the Parliament of the United Kingdom established in 1983
Constituencies of the Parliament of the United Kingdom disestablished in 1997
Politics of the London Borough of Richmond upon Thames